Julio José Gustavo Sardagna (1932–2009) was an Argentine neurologist and neurosurgeon.  

Julio Sardagna was born in Ensenada, Argentina. He received a Doctorate of Medicine and Ph.D. from the National University of La Plata School of Medicine in 1958 and 1960, respectively. Sardagna was a pioneer in the field of neurosurgery in the region and a founding member of the College of Neurosurgeons of the Province of Buenos Aires (1959).

References

1932 births
2009 deaths
People from Buenos Aires Province
Argentine people of Italian descent
National University of La Plata alumni
Argentine neurologists
Argentine surgeons
20th-century Argentine physicians
20th-century surgeons